National Route 1 is a trunk highway that is mostly known as the Circunvalar de San Andrés or Circunvalación de la Isla de San Andrés. This route runs along the perimeter of the island of San Andrés in the department of San Andrés and Providencia.

References

Buildings and structures in the Archipelago of San Andrés, Providencia and Santa Catalina
Highways in Colombia